Plaza Hotel is a hotel in New York City.

Plaza Hotel may also refer to:

Argentina
 Plaza Hotel Buenos Aires

Cuba
 Plaza Hotel (Havana)

United States
 Plaza Hotel (San Juan Bautista, California), a National Register of Historic Places listing in San Benito County, California
 Plaza Hotel (San Diego, California)
 Plaza Hotel (Colorado Springs, Colorado)
 Plaza Hotel (Jacksonville, Florida)
 Plaza Hotel (Trenton, Missouri)
 Plaza Hotel & Casino (Las Vegas, Nevada)
 Plaza Hotel (Las Vegas, New Mexico)
 Plaza Hotel (Columbus, Ohio), a National Register of Historic Places listing in Columbus, Ohio
 Plaza Hotel (Portland, Oregon), now known as Imperial Hotel
 Plaza Hotel, College Station, a hotel in Texas demolished in 2012
 Plaza Hotel (El Paso, Texas)
 Plaza Hotel (Thermopolis, Wyoming)

See also
 Park Plaza (disambiguation)